is a national park in Okinawa Prefecture, Japan. Established in 2016, it is located in and around the forested region of Yanbaru at the northern end of Okinawa Island. The day of establishment, 15 September, coincides with the anniversary of the 1983 discovery of the endangered endemic .

Future plans
Future extension of the Park is contingent upon the reversion of land currently occupied by the US military as the Northern Training Area. The northern part of Okinawa Island that corresponds with Yanbaru was in 2016 submitted for inscription on the UNESCO World Heritage List as part of the serial nomination Amami-Ōshima Island, Tokunoshima Island, northern part of Okinawa Island, and Iriomote Island. In 2021 was inscribed to World Heritage List.

See also
 List of national parks of Japan
 List of Natural Monuments of Japan (Okinawa)
 List of World Heritage Sites in Japan

References

External links
  Map of Yanbaru National Park

National parks of Japan
Parks and gardens in Okinawa Prefecture
Protected areas established in 2016
2016 establishments in Japan